Productidina is a suborder of brachiopods containing the families:
 Superfamily Productoidea
 Family Productellidae
 Family Productidae
 Superfamily Echinoconchoidea
 Family Echinoconchidae
 Family Sentosiidae
 Superfamily Linoproductoidea
 Family Linoproductidae
 Family Monticuliferidae

References

Strophomenata